Nikita Kotukov (born 26 July 1997) is a Russian Paralympic athlete. He represented Russian Paralympic Committee athletes at the 2020 Summer Paralympics.

Career
Kotukov represented Russian Paralympic Committee athletes at the 2020 Summer Paralympics in the men's long jump T47 event and won a bronze medal.

References

Living people
1997 births
Sportspeople from Ulyanovsk
Medalists at the World Para Athletics European Championships
Athletes (track and field) at the 2020 Summer Paralympics
Medalists at the 2020 Summer Paralympics
Paralympic medalists in athletics (track and field)
Paralympic bronze medalists for the Russian Paralympic Committee athletes
Russian male long jumpers
Russian male sprinters
21st-century Russian people